Dung beetles are any of various insects of the superfamily Scarabaeoidea, most of which feed on animal droppings.

Dung beetle(s) may also refer to:

 Dung Beetles (video game), a 1982 computer game
 Dung Beetles, characters from the Conker video game series
 "Dung Beetle", a song from the album  It Doesn't Matter Anymore by The Supernaturals

See also
 Beetle (disambiguation)